Bayou is a ballet made by New York City Ballet's co-founder and ballet master George Balanchine to Virgil Thomson's Acadian Songs and Dances (1947). The premiere took place on 21 February 1952 at City Center of Music and Drama, New York.

Original cast 

Francisco Moncion
Doris Breckenridge
Melissa Hayden
Hugh Laing
Diana Adams
Herbert Bliss

Reviews 
NY Times by John Martin, 22 February 1952

Articles
NY Times by Joseph Carman, 28 February 1999

Ballets by George Balanchine
Ballets to the music of Virgil Thomson
1952 ballet premieres
New York City Ballet repertory